Patrick Fitzgerald O'Bryant (born June 20, 1986) is an American-Central African former professional basketball player. The ,  center was selected out of Bradley University by the Golden State Warriors with the 9th overall pick in the 2006 NBA draft. He has been a member of the NBA's Warriors, Boston Celtics, and Toronto Raptors, and has also played in the NBA Development League, and overseas in Europe and Latin America.

College
O'Bryant attended Bradley University for two years and led the Braves to the Sweet Sixteen of the 2006 NCAA tournament before losing to University of Memphis. His breakout performance against traditional powerhouses Kansas and Pittsburgh at the tournament caught the eyes of NBA scouts. But in late 2005, O'Bryant, along with another student, was suspended for 8 games by the NCAA for receiving improper payments for work claimed he had undertaken in the summer, but had not actually done. All up he was paid $1,100 on a weekly basis, regardless of whether he showed up to work or not. On April 22, 2006, O'Bryant declared for the NBA draft, but did not hire an agent, making him eligible to return to college. However, O'Bryant made his declaration official the following month when he hired Andy Miller as his agent.

Professional career

Golden State Warriors
On June 28, 2006, O'Bryant was selected by the Golden State Warriors with the 9th overall pick in the 2006 NBA draft. On September 6, he was diagnosed with a fracture in his right foot. He was placed in an immobilizing boot on the injured foot and missed six weeks of training camp. He played sparingly in the 2006–07 season.

O'Bryant became the first NBA lottery pick to be sent down to the Bakersfield Jam of the D-League on December 30, 2006. On February 19, 2007, he was recalled from the Jam. Warriors head coach Don Nelson had critical words for him: "I told him if he goes down to the D-League and isn't a dominant player, there should be red flags all over the place, and he should be the first to notice. He's not only not dominating, he's not playing very well. He's a long-term project. I really liked him the first week of training camp, but I assumed there would be great progress. [...] He hasn't gotten better one bit."

Prior to the 2007–08 season, the Warriors declined to pick up his third-year option, which made him an unrestricted free agent at the end of the season. On March 10, 2008, he was reassigned to the Bakersfield Jam; however, he was later recalled and rejoined the Warriors for the remainder of the season.

Boston Celtics
On July 11, 2008, O'Bryant signed a two-year, $3.12 million contract with the Boston Celtics. He had an impressive workout with the team a week earlier and was expected to be the backup center for Kendrick Perkins.

Toronto Raptors
On February 19, 2009, O'Bryant was traded by Boston to the Toronto Raptors in a 3-team deal with Will Solomon going to the Sacramento Kings, and a heavily-protected future second-round pick going to the Celtics.

China
In September, 2010, O'Bryant signed a contract with Fujian Xunxing of the Chinese Basketball Association, but was later released because of poor performances in pre-season, as well as a reported lack of effort in practice.

Return to the NBA D-League
On January 10, 2011, O'Bryant joined the Reno Bighorns of the NBA Development League.

Europe
In August 2011 he signed with Kavala B.C.

Puerto Rico
In February 2012 he signed with the Indios de Mayagüez of Puerto Rico.

Return to Reno and Lietuvos Rytas
On January 16, 2013, O'Bryant was reacquired by the Reno Bighorns. He was bought out of his contract on January 30. He then joined Lietuvos rytas. Despite being signed as one of the team's main centers, his playing time decreased over the following months. O'Bryant was released on May 6, 2013.

Charlotte Bobcats
In September 2013, O'Bryant signed with the Charlotte Bobcats. However, he was waived on October 23.

Taiwan
In November 2013, O'Bryant signed with Taiwan Beer of the Super Basketball League.
On April 24, 2016, O'Bryant won the Final's MVP award while playing for Taiwan Beer.

The BIG3 League
On May 5, 2018, O'Bryant signed on to play in the BIG3 League. He also coaches in Las Vegas with the private coaching service, CoachUp.

London Lightning
On October 27, 2018, O'Bryant signed with the London Lightning of the National Basketball League of Canada.

National team career
O'Bryant holds a Central African passport, and has played with the senior Central African national team at the AfroBasket 2013 tournament, helping the team reach the playoff stage.

SBL career statistics (Taiwan)

Regular season

Post season

NBA career statistics

Regular season

|-
| align="left" | 
| align="left" | Golden State
| 16 || 0 || 7.4 || .313 || .000 || .647 || 1.3 || .6 || .4 || .5 || 1.9
|-
| align="left" | 
| align="left" | Golden State
| 24 || 0 || 4.1 || .552 || .000 || .600 || 1.2 || .2 || .2 || .4 || 1.5
|-
| align="left" | 
| align="left" | Boston
| 26 || 0 || 4.2 || .516 || .000 || .667 || 1.3 || .3 || .1 || .3 || 1.5
|-
| align="left" | 
| align="left" | Toronto
| 13 || 3 || 11.3 || .547 || .000 || .375 || 2.5 || .2 || .2 || .8 || 4.7
|-
| align="left" | 
| align="left" | Toronto
| 11 || 0 || 4.6 || .533 || .000 || .500 || 1.0 || .1 || .2 || .4 || 1.7
|- class="sortbottom"
| style="text-align:center;" colspan="2"| Career
| 90 || 3 || 5.8 || .494 || .000 || .583 || 1.4 || .3 || .2 || .4 || 2.1

Playing style
O'Bryant was a late bloomer who was not heavily recruited out of high school. He plays the center position and is known for his shot-blocking ability, as he led the Missouri Valley Conference in blocks for two straight years, and is also a solid rebounder. He has a 7'6" wingspan. His offensive game also features a skyhook.

References

External links
 
 
 Patrick O'Bryant Draft 2006 Profile @ NBA.com
 
 In-Depth Scouting Report at JustBBall.Com's HoopsAction
 Patrick O'Bryant 07-08 highlight reel in the NBA

1986 births
Living people
American expatriate basketball people in Canada
American expatriate basketball people in China
American expatriate basketball people in Greece
American expatriate basketball people in Lithuania
American expatriate basketball people in the Philippines
American expatriate basketball people in Taiwan
American expatriate basketball people in Venezuela
American men's basketball players
Naturalized citizens of Central African Republic
Atléticos de San Germán players
Bakersfield Jam players
Basketball players from Iowa
BC Rytas players
Big3 players
Boston Celtics players
Bradley Braves men's basketball players
Centers (basketball)
Central African Republic men's basketball players
Golden State Warriors draft picks
Golden State Warriors players
Greek Basket League players
Kavala B.C. players
London Lightning players
NorthPort Batang Pier players
People from Oskaloosa, Iowa
Philippine Basketball Association imports
Reno Bighorns players
Toronto Raptors players
American men's 3x3 basketball players
Fubon Braves players
Taiwan Beer basketball players
Super Basketball League imports